The  is a private railway company in Japan, part of the Odakyu Group. It is best known for its operation of the Hakone Tozan Line, the first mountain railway in Japan, but like most Japanese railway companies, also operates bus service, namely Hakone Tozan Bus. It also operates the connecting Hakone Tozan Cable Car.

At Gōra, a  cable car is available to transfer visitors to and from Lake Ashi.

See also
 Rhaetian Railway, A Swiss mountain railway network, twinning railway with Hakone Tozan Railway.

References

External links

 
 Hakone Tozan Railway guide (in English)

 
Hakone, Kanagawa